The Dungeons & Dragons Gazetteer is a supplement to the 3rd edition of the Dungeons & Dragons role-playing game.

Contents
The Dungeons & Dragons Gazetteer details the lands of the 3rd edition core world of Dungeons & Dragons, presented as an example of how a fantasy game world can be built.  The book's introduction noted that the D&D game setting is located on Oerth, more specifically on the continent of Oerik, in its easternmost portion called the Flanaess.

Publication history
The Dungeons & Dragons Gazetteer was written by Gary Holian, Erik Mona, Sean Reynolds, and Frederick Weining, and published in 2000. Cover art was by Sam Wood, with interior art by Dennis Cramer.

Reception

Reviews
Backstab #24

References

Dungeons & Dragons sourcebooks
Greyhawk books
Role-playing game supplements introduced in 2000